Billy Clark (born 20 October 1991) is an English professional footballer who plays for Bury Town. He previously played in the Football League for Ipswich Town.

Club career
Clark made his début for Ipswich as a substitute in a 1–1 draw with Doncaster Rovers on 17 April 2010. He made two further appearances from the bench for Ipswich in the 2009/10 season against Newcastle United and Sheffield United. In April 2011 he made the news by tweeting that he was happy to be leaving the club when his contract expired at the end of the 2010–11 season, prompting a response from manager Paul Jewell that he could leave immediately if he felt this way. Later, after speaking to Clark, Jewell forgave the player and allowed him to remain at the club until the end of the season.

References

External links

1991 births
Living people
English footballers
Footballers from Suffolk
Sportspeople from Ipswich
Association football midfielders
Ipswich Town F.C. players
Bury Town F.C. players
English Football League players